Rhizomucor miehei (also: Mucor miehei ) is a species of fungus. It is commercially used to produce enzymes which can be used to produce a microbial rennet to curd milk and produce cheese.

Under experimental conditions, this species grows particularly well at temperatures between 24 and 55°C, and their growth becomes negligible below 21°C or above 57°C.

It is also used to produce lipases for interesterification of fats.

See also
 Industrial enzymes

References

External links
 Index Fungorum listing

Fungi